Jovan Divjak (11 March 1937 – 8 April 2021) was a Bosnian army general who served as the Deputy Commander of the Bosnian army's main staff until 1994, during the Bosnian War.

Early life and education
Divjak was born in Belgrade to parents originally from the Bosanska Krajina region of Bosnia. His father was stationed in the Yugoslav People's Army (JNA) in Serbia. His family, like himself when he was alive, currently reside in Sarajevo, where Divjak moved in 1966. From 1956 to 1959, he attended the Military Academy in Belgrade. In 1964 and 1965, he attended the École d'État Major in Paris. Although Divjak was an ethnic Serb born in Serbia, he identified as a Bosnian.

Career
From 1969 to 1971, Divjak was in the Cadet Academy in Belgrade, and from 1979 to 1981, he served in the War and Defense Planning School there. After several posts in the JNA, he was appointed Territorial Defense Chief in command of the Mostar sector from 1984 to 1989 and the Sarajevo sector from 1989 to 1991.

Between 1991 and 1993, Divjak was court-martialed by the JNA for issuing 120 pieces of light armor and 20,000 bullets to the Kiseljak Territorial Defence and was sentenced to nine months' imprisonment. He avoided the sentence by leaving the JNA and joining the Territorial Defense of the Republic of Bosnia and Herzegovina. In the first days of war, he was arrested under the charge of collaborating with the Serb forces and was imprisoned for 27 days. In prison, Divjak was on a hunger strike for four days.

Divjak later became the Deputy Commander of the Territorial Defense forces of Bosnia and Herzegovina and a month later he oversaw the defence of Sarajevo from a major JNA attack. Between 1993 and 1997, Divjak served as the Deputy Commander of the Headquarters of the Army of Bosnia and Herzegovina, charged with co-operating with civilian institutions and organisations (administration, economy, health, and education).

Divjak, as an ethnic Serb, was made a general in order to present a multiethnic character of the Army of the Republic of Bosnia and Herzegovina. He himself commented on the issue by saying that he felt like a "flower arrangement" and said that "of course, someone has to be a flower arrangement too". He expressed that it was shameful if his service to the army were only temporary. Indeed, he and Stjepan Šiber (as a Croat) were the only non-Bosniaks in the Chief of Staff. Both of them were offered retirement in March 1996 by the Chairman of the Presidency of Bosnia and Herzegovina, Alija Izetbegović. At the beginning of the war, out of 18 percent of Croats and 12 percent of Serbs, only one percent of both remained in the ranks of the Bosnian army. Divjak complained about that to Rasim Delić, then a Chief of Staff, as well as Izetbegović, but it was explained that it was because "Bosniak soldiers didn't trust the Serb commanders." Divjak was later excluded by Delić from the decision making process in the Army. The Bosniaks in the Army allegedly had no confidence in Serb commanders according to Oslobođenje.

Later life

Divjak was the executive director of OGBH ("Obrazovanje Gradi BiH": "Education builds Bosnia and Herzegovina"), which he co-founded. The association's goals are to help children whose families are victims of the war, by providing grants of money, but also to help education in Bosnia, even in the poorest parts of the country, by providing financial and material support.

Divjak has won many international and national awards, including the French Legion of Honour, Order of Lafayette, Sixth of April Award of Sarajevo, the International League of Humanists Plaque, and the Plaque of the Sarajevo Canton.

From 2004 until his death, he was a member of the Steering Board of the NGO Reference Group, Sarajevo. From 1998 until his death, Divjak was a member of the Association of Independent Intellectuals "Krug 99", Sarajevo. Before 1998, he was an active member of other associations, including sports associations, and the faculty of physical education in Sarajevo, and he has been a member of various NGOs in Bosnia.

Divjak enjoyed popularity among the general public of Sarajevo, and has been dubbed Jovo Divjak, General Jovo and Uncle Jovo.
He was the author of two books:
In French "Sarajevo, mon amour". Entretiens avec Florence La Bruyere; published by Buchet-Chastel in 2004 with a foreword by Bernard-Henri Lévy.
In Bosnian, "Ratovi u Hrvatskoj i Bosni i Hercegovini 1991–1995",  "Dani" and Jesenski and Tura in 1999. 

He appeared in the BBC documentary The Death of Yugoslavia in 1995 and is the subject of a 2013 Al-Jazeera World documentary, Sarajevo My Love.

In 2006, he was awarded the title of Universal Peace Ambassador by the Worldwide Council of the Universal Ambassador Peace Circle in Geneva.

On 3 March 2011, Divjak was arrested in Vienna in response to a Serbian arrest warrant accusing him of war crimes relating to an attack on a Yugoslav army column in Sarajevo early in the 1992–95 war. However, Austria did not extradite him to Belgrade. On 8 March 2011, he was bailed from custody in Vienna and on 29 July 2011, he was released after Serbia's extradition request was denied by an Austrian court due to lack of evidence and the inability to guarantee a fair trial in Serbia.

Personal life
Divjak was married to his wife Vera from 1960 until her death in 2017. They had two sons, one of whom served in the Bosnian army. He also had a godson who is a Bosniak whose brothers were killed in the Bosnian War.

Death
On 8 April 2021, Divjak died in Sarajevo at the age of 84. Divjak was buried in Sarajevo at the Bare Cemetery on 13 April, five days after his death.

Reactions
Following Divjak's death, many prominent Bosnian politicians and public figures reacted to his death, including Bosnian Presidency members Željko Komšić and Šefik Džaferović, former Presidency member Bakir Izetbegović, newly elected Mayor of Sarajevo Benjamina Karić, poet and screenwriter Abdulah Sidran, former footballers Emir Spahić and Faruk Hadžibegić and many others.

Foreign media also reacted to Divjak's death, with the likes of Voice of America, El País, France 24, Swissinfo and others remembering his life.

Tributes
The day after Divjak's death, on 9 April, the people of Mostar said their last goodbyes to Divjak. The same day, an image of Divjak was projected at the Vijećnica (Sarajevo City Hall), thus Sarajevo symbolically paying tribute to him.

Upon his death, the government of the Sarajevo Canton announced that 13 April 2021, the day of his burial, would be a national day of mourning in the whole Canton.

Books

References

Notes

News reports

External links

The OGBH association

1937 births
2021 deaths
Military personnel from Belgrade
Military personnel from Sarajevo
Serbs of Bosnia and Herzegovina
Bosnia and Herzegovina generals
Army of the Republic of Bosnia and Herzegovina soldiers
Bosnia and Herzegovina writers
Recipients of the Legion of Honour
Burials at Bare Cemetery, Sarajevo